Baird may refer to:

Places

United States
 Baird, Mississippi, an unincorporated community
 Baird, Missouri, an unincorporated community
 Baird, Texas, a city
 Baird, Washington, a community
 Baird Mountains, Alaska
 Baird Inlet, Alaska

Elsewhere
 Baird, Hastings, a local government ward in the county of East Sussex, England
 Baird Island, Queensland, Australia
 Baird Peninsula, Nunavut, Canada

People
Baird (surname)
Baird (given name)

Historic American buildings
Baird Cottage, Harrietstown, New York
Baird Hardware Company Warehouse, Gainesville, Florida, also known as the Baird Center
Baird House (disambiguation), two houses
Baird Law Office, Green Bay, Wisconsin
Baird's Tavern, in the town of Warwick, New York

Brands and organizations
Baird Ornithological Club, in Reading, Pennsylvania, founded in 1921
Robert W. Baird & Co., a financial services company
A brand of television sold by BrightHouse

Other
Baird baronets, five titles, three in the Baronetage of Nova Scotia and two in the Baronetage of the UK
Baird's rule for triplet states in organic chemistry
 Baird School, a fictional preparatory school in the movie Scent of a Woman

See also
Baird's beaked whale
Baird's sandpiper, a small shorebird
Baird's sparrow, a small North American bird
Baird's Manual of American College Fraternities, a 1879 compendium of fraternities and sororities in the US and Canada